Col. Silas Alexander Sharpe House is a historic home located at Statesville, Iredell County, North Carolina.  The house was built between about 1860 and 1865, and is a two-story, three bay, Classical Revival style frame dwelling.  It features an elegant two-story, front portico with clustered columns.

It was added to the National Register of Historic Places in 1980.

References

Houses on the National Register of Historic Places in North Carolina
Neoclassical architecture in North Carolina
Houses completed in 1865
Houses in Iredell County, North Carolina
National Register of Historic Places in Iredell County, North Carolina